When the Evening Bells Ring (German: Wenn die Abendglocken läuten) is a 1930 German silent drama film directed by Hanns Beck-Gaden and starring Josef Berger, Rosa Kirchner-Lang and Hanns Beck-Gaden. It is a heimatfilm set in Bavaria.

Cast
 Josef Berger as Melchner 
 Rosa Kirchner-Lang as Seine Frau 
 Hanns Beck-Gaden as Hans, beider Sohn 
 Franz Loskarn as Michel, beider Sohn 
 Maria Mindzenty as Annerl, Pflegekind 
 Emmy Kronberg as Saffy, Zigeunerin 
 Theo Kasper as Pietro, Zigeuner 
 Kaethe Consee as Mosnerwirtin 
 Fritz Bernet as Simmerl, Gemeindediener 
 Fritz Müller as Ein Vagabund

References

Bibliography 
 Langford, Michelle. Germany: Directory of World Cinema. Intellect Books, 2012.

External links 
 

1930 films
Films of the Weimar Republic
German drama films
1930 drama films
German silent feature films
Films set in Bavaria
German black-and-white films
Silent drama films
1930s German films